Knifley is an unincorporated community near Columbia in Adair County, Kentucky, United States.  Its elevation is 718 feet (219 m). Knifley also has a volunteer fire department.

The Knifley Christian Church has an annual community fish fry every May for any & all free.

References

http://usfiredept.com/knifley-area-volunteer-fire-department-12232.html

http://usfiredept.com/knifley-area-volunteer-fire-department-12232.html

Unincorporated communities in Adair County, Kentucky
Unincorporated communities in Kentucky